Andrea Berez-Kroeker is a documentary linguist and professor in the Dept. of Linguistics at the University of Hawai'i-Manoa. She is the director of the Kaipuleohone archive of endangered languages.  She is an expert on the practices of reproducibility and management of data in the field of linguistics.

Language documentation 
Berez-Kroeker's work has focused on the documentation and preservation of endangered languages. She has created language documentation materials for the Athabascan languages Ahtna and Dena'ina. She completed her PhD at the University of California-Santa Barbara in 2011 with a dissertation titled “Discourse, Landscape, and Directional Reference in Ahtna.” Her work on Ahtna includes using GIS to investigate the lexicalization of directionals, a subcategory of deixis, in language.

Her recent documentary work in Papua New Guinea includes documentation of Kuman as well as a video documentary of Kere, a language.

She is the editor of books on language change, linguistic fieldwork, and a lexicon of Dena'ina.

Linguistic data 
Berez-Kroeker has given talks and workshops on reproducibility in the field of linguistics, including data sharing and citation. She currently works to create infrastructure that promotes the long-term sustainability and interoperability of data. She is a principal investigator for a National Science Foundation grant studying the practices of data citation and attribution of data in the field of linguistics, including the creation and dissemination of resources on data use and sharing.

Honors and awards 
Berez-Kroeker was the president of Delaman (Digital Endangered Languages and Musics Archives Network) from 2014-2016 and in 2017 was the senior co-chair of the Committee on Endangered Languages and Their Preservation of the Linguistic Society of America.

Berez-Kroeker received the Early Career Award in 2019 from the Linguistic Society of America for her work on the documentation of endangered languages. In particular, the society recognized her for the "technological sophistication to her work, especially in the areas of language archiving, data processing, and visualization."

References

External links 
 Andrea L. Berez-Kroeker
 Kaipuleohone

Living people
Linguists of Papuan languages
Linguists of Chimbu–Wahgi languages
Linguists of Na-Dene languages
Linguists from the United States
University of Hawaiʻi faculty
Women linguists
Year of birth missing (living people)